Anadia Futebol Clube  (abbreviated as Anadia FC) is a Portuguese football club based in Anadia in the district of Aveiro. Anadia is also a club for field hockey and basketball.

Background
Anadia FC currently plays in the Campeonato de Portugal which is the third tier of Portuguese football. The club was founded in 1926 and they play their home matches at the Municipal Engº Sílvio Henriques Cerveira in Anadia. The stadium is able to accommodate 6,500 spectators.

The club is affiliated to Associação de Futebol de Aveiro and has competed in the AF Aveiro Taça. The club has also entered the national cup competition known as Taça de Portugal on many occasions.

Anadia lost its president António Simões in a car crash on 20 November 2009. The situation created huge problems in its structure, which it was resolved with a constitution by the Administrative Commission (Comissão Administrativa). He was succeeded by Manuel Pinho.

Appearances

Second National Level: 2
Segunda Divisão: 12
Terceira Divisão: 34

Current squad

Season to season

League and cup history

Honours
Terceira Divisão: 2006/07, 2009/10
	AF Aveiro 1ª Divisão: 1969/70

Footnotes

External links
Official website 

Football clubs in Portugal
Association football clubs established in 1926
1926 establishments in Portugal